Boucheligue Brothers Stadium is a football stadium in Magra, Algeria. The stadium holds 8,000 people. It serves as a home ground for NC Magra which plays in Algerian Ligue Professionnelle 1.

References

 
Sports venues in Algeria